Nyambura is a name of Kikuyu origin that may refer to:

Catherine Nyambura Ndereba (born 1972), Kenyan marathon runner
Chief Nyambura (born 1991), Kenyan international footballer
Jane Nyambura (1964/1965–2010), Kenyan singer known as Queen Jane
Judith Nyambura Mwangi (born 1986), Kenyan singer known as Avril
Stella Nyambura Mwangi (born 1986), Kenyan-Norwegian musician
Virginia Nyambura (born 1993), Kenyan steeplechase runner

Kenyan names